15 Squadron or 15th Squadron may refer to:

Aviation squadrons
 No. 15 Squadron PAF, a unit of the Pakistan Air Force
 No. 15 Squadron RAAF, a unit of the Royal Australian Air Force
 No. 15 Squadron RAF, a unit of the United Kingdom Royal Air Force
 No. 15 Squadron RNZAF, a unit of the Royal New Zealand Air Force
 15 Squadron SAAF, a unit of the South African Air Force
 15th Airlift Squadron, a unit of the United States Air Force
 15th Antisubmarine Squadron, a former unit of the United States Army Air Forces, most recently the 15th Special Operations Squadron
 15th Bombardment Squadron (Light), a unit of the United States Army Air Forces
 15th Bombardment Squadron, Very Heavy, a former unit of the United States Army Air Forces, most recently the 915th Air Refueling Squadron
 15th Fighter Squadron, a former unit of the United States Air Force, most recently the 15th Test Squadron
 15th Military Airlift Squadron, a former unit of the United States Air Force, most recently the 15th Airlift Squadron
 15th Photographic Reconnaissance Squadron, a former unit of the United States Army Air Forces, most recently the 556th Test and Evaluation Squadron
 15th Reconnaissance Squadron, a unit of the United States Air Force
 15th Reconnaissance Squadron, Medium a former unit of the United States Army Air Forces, most recently the 405th Tactical Missile Squadron
 15th Special Operations Squadron, a unit of the United States Air Force
 15th Tactical Reconnaissance Squadron, a former unit of the United States Air Force, most recently the 15th Reconnaissance Squadron
 15th Test Squadron, a unit of the United States Air Force
 15th Troop Carrier Squadron, a former unit of the United States Air Force, most recently the 15th Airlift Squadron
 VFA-15 (Strike Fighter Squadron 15), a unit of the United States Navy
 HM-15 (Helicopter Mine Countermeasures Squadron 15), a unit of the United States Navy

Ground combat squadrons

 15 Air Assault Close Support Squadron RLC, a unit of the United Kingdom Army
 No. 15 Squadron RAF Regiment, a unit of the United Kingdom Royal Air Force

ja:第15飛行隊